The third season of the American animated television series Star Trek: Lower Decks follows the various missions and adventures of the "lower deckers" (low-ranking officers with menial jobs) on the USS Cerritos, one of Starfleet's least important starships. The season is produced by CBS Eye Animation Productions in association with Secret Hideout, Important Science, Roddenberry Entertainment, and animation studio Titmouse, with Mike McMahan serving as showrunner and Barry J. Kelly as supervising director.

Tawny Newsome, Jack Quaid, Noël Wells, and Eugene Cordero voice the lower decks crew members of the Cerritos, with Dawnn Lewis, Jerry O'Connell, Fred Tatasciore, and Gillian Vigman providing voices for the ship's senior officers. A third season of Lower Decks was ordered in April 2021, and voice recording began by June. Writing for the season was completed that September, and picked up from the cliffhanger ending of the second season. Voice recording was mostly completed by June 2022. The season features many connections and references to past Star Trek series such as Star Trek: The Next Generation and Star Trek: Deep Space Nine, including several actors returning as guest stars.

The season premiered on the streaming service Paramount+ on August 25, 2022, and ran for 10 episodes until October 27. A fourth season was ordered in January 2022.



Episodes

<onlyinclude>{{Episode table |background=365B83 |caption=Star Trek: Lower Decks season 3 episodes |overall=5 |season=5 |title=25 |director=20 |writer=25 |airdate=20 |released=y |airdateR= |episodes=

{{Episode list/sublist|Star Trek: Lower Decks (season 3)
 |EpisodeNumber   = 23
 |EpisodeNumber2  = 3
 |Title           = Mining the Mind's Mines
 |DirectedBy      = Fill Marc Sagadraca
 |WrittenBy       = Brian D. Bradley
 |OriginalAirDate = 
 |ShortSummary    = Starfleet oversees peace relations between aliens called the Scrubble and Federation scientists on Jengus IV. Mariner, Boimler, and Rutherford are sent to assist members of the Carlsbad in deactivating the Scrubble's psychic landmines on the planet's surface. The mines show a person's deepest desires, turning them to stone if they touch the illusions. Meanwhile, Tendi experiences her first day of senior science officer training under Dr. Migleemo, who tasks her with getting the Captain's attention during her extensive peace negotiations. A representative of the Scrubble gifts Captain Freeman and Carlsbad'''s Captain Maier with a rock. Tendi scans it, noting strange readings, but fails to gain Freeman's attention. Discouraged, she returns to the med lab, where Commander T'Ana gives her a pep talk. On Jengus IV, the Cerritos crew receive a cold welcome from their Carlsbad counterparts and worry that they have gained a reputation as slackers. While seeking to outperform the crew, several of the mines detonate, and they all flee into a nearby cave. Noticing that the mines seem to pulling random information from them beyond their desires, the group discover that the mines actually pull and record all psychic information, and that the Scrubble and scientists are secretly working together to datamine Starfleet. They unsuccessfully attempt to warn Freeman, until an emboldened Tendi smashes the rock gift and reveals that it contains technology designed to spy on them. The Scrubble and scientist representatives are detained for questioning. The Carlsbad crew reveal that their behavior was due to their awe of the Cerritos crew, who have a reputation as mavericks among the other California-class ships.
 |LineColor       = 365B83
}}

}}</onlyinclude>

Cast and characters

Main
 Tawny Newsome as Beckett Mariner
 Jack Quaid as Brad Boimler
 Noël Wells as D'Vana Tendi
 Eugene Cordero as Sam Rutherford
 Dawnn Lewis as Carol Freeman
 Jerry O'Connell as Jack Ransom
 Fred Tatasciore as Shaxs
 Gillian Vigman as T'Ana

Recurring
 Carlos Alazraqui as Les Buenamigo
 Phil LaMarr as Alonzo Freeman and other voices
 Kari Wahlgren as Sylvia Ront and other voices
 Nolan North as Lars Lundy and K'ranch
 Paul Scheer as Andy Billups
 Lauren Lapkus as Jennifer Sh'reyan
 Ben Rodgers as Steve Stevens
 Carl Tart as Kayshon
 Paul F. Tompkins as Migleemo
 Baron Vaughn as Maier
 Georgia King as Petra Aberdeen
 Jessica McKenna as Barnes
 Gabrielle Ruiz as Castro and T'Lyn

Notable guests
 James Cromwell as Zefram Cochrane
 J.G. Hertzler as Martok and Drookmani captain
 Susan Gibney as Leah Brahms
 Asif Ali, Mary Holland, and Artemis Pebdani as Delta Shift
 Armin Shimerman as Quark
 Nana Visitor as Kira Nerys
 Jeffrey Combs as AGIMUS
 Kether Donohue as Peanut Hamper
 George Takei as Hikaru Sulu
 Toks Olagundoye as Amina Ramsey
 Sam Richardson as Vendome
 Al Rodrigo as Durango
 Michelle Wong as Wong

Production
Development and writing
When announcing the premiere date for the second season of Star Trek: Lower Decks in April 2021, Paramount+ also officially ordered a 10-episode third season of the series. Writing for the season had begun by late May, with creator and showrunner Mike McMahan knowing the direction for half of the season's episodes at that point. All of the scripts for the season were completed by mid-September.

The series focuses on the support crew, or "lower deckers", of the USS Cerritos, though McMahan came to feel by the end of the second season that the bridge crew should also be explored more because they are "the top of the USS Cerritos but they're one of the bottoms of the fleet. That makes the Cerritos itself a lower decker." Following the second season's cliffhanger ending, McMahan said the third would follow Captain Freeman's trial for allegedly destroying the Pakled homeworld. This continues the series' ongoing storyline about the Pakleds. The third season also explores the new relationship between Beckett Mariner and Jennifer Sh'reyan, but McMahan said Mariner's romantic relationship would not become the focus of the series as her character arc was still based on her friendships and her relationship with her mother, Captain Freeman. He said Mariner and Freeman had grown closer in the second season and the latter's arrest would lead to a new dynamic, with Mariner not "directing her energy in the most applicable way" in the third season. Freeman's trial is resolved quickly in the season premiere, during a montage of events that the main characters were not involved in featuring Star Trek characters Morgan Bateson and Tuvok. McMahan felt this was "perfectly in keeping with the point of the series".

McMahan said the third season would take the first steps towards moving the lower deckers up in rank, showing each take a different path to become the people that he planned for them to be at the end of the series. These new personal missions for the main characters are introduced across the first few episodes of the season, and McMahan said they would "change the playing field of the entire show". He said Brad Boimler's lessons in the first two seasons would lead him down a new path, while D'Vana Tendi starts a new job in the sciences division after McMahan felt there was no room for her to grow in the medical division. For Sam Rutherford, the secrets behind his cyborg implant carry over from the second season as an ongoing story that was influenced by the "secret past" of Star Trek: Deep Space Nine character Julian Bashir. McMahan noted that augmentation is "a dirty word in Star Trek. It should always have made somebody lift an eyebrow that Rutherford had that" implant, and the third season would explain why in an "interesting, fun Lower Decks way". The friendships between the main characters are further explored in "Room for Growth", which was inspired by the "room lottery" at McMahan's college. He wanted the episode to be "about the journey and not the destination" similar to the 1986 coming-of-age film Stand by Me, and based several of the episode's locations on scenes from that film.

The sixth episode revisits the Deep Space 9 space station from Deep Space Nine; McMahan described the episode as "one last walk around Deep Space 9". He binge-watched episodes of that series before breaking the episode's story, to help decide which elements to include, and settled on a storyline featuring the Karemma from the episode "Starship Down". McMahan thought those aliens would "still be flirting with doing trade with the Federation" at this point in the timeline, about six years after Deep Space Nine ended. Similarly, he felt the character Kira Nerys would still be running the space station and wanted to feature her alongside main character Shaxs due to their shared history. The episode also brings back the Deep Space Nine character Quark, who had previously been referenced in Lower Decks as the owner of a bar franchise. The episode's title, "Hear All, Trust Nothing", is one of the Rules of Acquisition used by Ferengi such as Quark in Deep Space Nine. McMahan originally did not include Mariner in the Deep Space 9 visit because she used to serve on the space station and "didn't want to go running back in there", but actress Tawny Newsome asked him to rewrite the end of the episode's script to include Mariner on the space station because Deep Space Nine is her favorite Star Trek series.

"A Mathematically Perfect Redemption" is the episode that McMahan felt was "truly [his] own" for the season, featuring the exocomp Peanut Hamper from the first-season finale. The episode features scenes of Peanut Hamper alone in space while the opening credits are shown instead of the normal title sequence. McMahan compared the character's interactions with the bird-like Areore species to the films Dances with Wolves (1990), The Last Samurai (2003), and Avatar (2009), which he felt was new territory for the Star Trek franchise. He also compared Peanut Hamper's character arc to that of Maui from Moana (2016), though the episode ends with her "true nature" being confirmed as a "manipulative and cunning robot". This brings her into contact with the evil computer AGIMUS from the second season, setting up a continuation of their storyline in the fourth season.

Casting and voice recording
The series stars a group of ensigns serving in the "lower decks" of the Cerritos—Tawny Newsome as Beckett Mariner, Jack Quaid as Brad Boimler, Noël Wells as D'Vana Tendi, and Eugene Cordero as Sam Rutherford—and the ship's bridge crew who believe "the show is about them, but it's not"—Dawnn Lewis as Captain Carol Freeman, Jerry O'Connell as first officer Commander Jack Ransom, Fred Tatasciore as security chief Lieutenant Shaxs, and Gillian Vigman as chief medical officer Dr. T'Ana.

McMahan stated in May 2021 that there would be "legacy guest roles" in the season, but they would be "people you're not going to expect when you get them" which he felt was more surprising and satisfying for fans. That December, Jonathan Frakes said he was reprising his role of William Riker from Star Trek: The Next Generation after doing the same in the previous seasons, but the character ultimately did not appear. In April 2022, J.G. Hertzler was revealed to be reprising his role as Klingon Chancellor Martok from Deep Space Nine, though this is a virtual version of the character that is part of the tabletop game Bat'leths & BIHnuchs, a Klingon version of the real-world game Dungeons & Dragons. Hertzler also reprises his role as the Drookmani captain from the first season of Lower Decks. Similar to Hertzler's role as Martok in the season, James Cromwell voices a holographic version of Zefram Cochrane, his character from Star Trek: First Contact (1996), in the season premiere; Susan Gibney reprises her role as Dr. Leah Brahms from The Next Generation, who appears as a fantasy created by psychic objects; and George Takei reprises his original Star Trek role of Hikaru Sulu in a hallucination that Boimler has. Armin Shimerman and Nana Visitor reprise their respective Deep Space Nine roles as Quark and Kira Nerys for "Hear All, Trust Nothing". When recording the episode, Shimerman used the same prosthetic teeth that he wore during filming for that series to ensure that Lower Decks Quark sounded the same. 

Second-season guest star Gabrielle Ruiz returns as T'Lyn for the third season, but only for a small role because the season was written before McMahan saw the positive fan reaction to the character in the second season. He hoped to explore the character further in future seasons. Also returning from earlier seasons are Phil LaMarr as Mariner's father, Admiral Alonzo Freeman; Nolan North as transporter chief Lars Lundy; Paul Scheer as chief engineer Andy Billups; Lauren Lapkus as Jennifer Sh'reyan, Mariner's Andorian girlfriend; writer Ben Rodgers as Lieutenant Steve Stevens; Carl Tart as Kayshon; Paul F. Tompkins as Dr. Migleemo; Jessica McKenna as Ensign Barnes as well as the Cerritos computer; Jeffrey Combs as the evil computer AGIMUS; Kether Donohue as the narcissistic exocomp Peanut Hamper; Michelle Wong as Admiral Wong; and Asif Ali as Asif, Mary Holland as Moxy, and Artemis Pebdani as Karavitus, all members of Delta Shift. Voicing other California-class captains in the season are the returning Toks Olagundoye as Amina Ramsey of the USS Oakland, Sam Richardson as Vendome of the USS Inglewood, and Al Rodrigo as Durango of the USS Merced, as well as new character Maier (voiced by Baron Vaughn) of the USS Carlsbad. Other new characters introduced in the season include Admiral Les Buenamigo who is voiced by Carlos Alazraqui, the father of Star Trek: Prodigy star Rylee Alazraqui; and Georgia King's Petra Aberdeen, an archaeologist similar to the Next Generation character Vash who McMahan intended to be an "appealing alternative to Starfleet for Mariner... a cool, female, space Indiana Jones".

Newsome began recording voice overs for the season in early June 2021. She was able to work in a recording studio for the season, which was not possible on the previous season due to the COVID-19 pandemic. However, she was still unable to record with Quaid, as she did on the first season, due to his commitments filming the series The Boys. Frakes had recorded lines for the season with Quaid by late December. Newsome said she had finished recording for the season by March 2022, and Cordero said in June that recording was mostly complete. Newsome was doing additional dialogue recording (ADR) for the season later that month.

Animation and design
Independent animation studio Titmouse provides the animation for the series, with Barry J. Kelly serving as supervising director for the season. Animatics were produced by mid-October 2021, and the season was completed by mid-July 2022. The animation style reflects the look of "prime time animated comedy" series such as The Simpsons, but with more detailed backgrounds and environments than is traditional for prime time animation.

The character K'ranch, a new alien created for the series who is a weapons-loving Kromsapiod, was inspired by the Deep Space Nine character Tosk. K'ranch was created because the animation team wanted to make a new character that fit within the Star Trek franchise but also took advantage of the series' animated format more than alien species that were created for live-action do. His name is a combination of ketchup and ranch dressing. The season premiere recreates scenes and locations from Star Trek: First Contact as part of a tourist destination dedicated to the events of that film. McMahan explained that those events were logged by the crew of the Enterprise following the film which allowed Starfleet to accurately recreate them. "Mining the Mind's Mines" was inspired by "classic 'trapped-in-a-cave' planetary episode[s]" from previous Star Trek series which were often filmed on Stage 16 of the Paramount Pictures studio lot in Los Angeles. McMahan also took inspiration for the episode's setting from the muted colors of Star Trek comic books published by Gold Key Comics in the 1960s and 1970s.

Music
For the First Contact homages in the season premiere, Jerry Goldsmith's main theme from that film can be heard. The song "Magic Carpet Ride" by Steppenwolf, which was used in the film, is also heard in the episode.

Marketing
A teaser and first key art for the season were released during a panel for the series at the Star Trek: Mission Chicago convention in April 2022, part of a week of celebrations for "First Contact Day", marking the fictional holiday of April 5 when first contact between humans and aliens was made in the Star Trek universe. The panel included Newsome, Quaid, Wells, and O'Connell all in cosplay as their characters, as well as McMahan, and the cold open and first scene of a season three episode was also shown to the audience. Discussing the teaser that was released at the panel, Arezou Amin of Collider said it was vague but promised "more of the comedy the show has become known for" along with increased stakes from the previous seasons. Dylan Kelly at Yahoo! said it "offers a myriad of new challenges" for the main characters, including a "chaotic USS Cerritos hijacking".

The final key art was revealed in mid-July, along with the season premiere date, and continued a theme for the series of replicating classic Star Trek film posters. This poster pays homage to the one for Star Trek III: The Search for Spock (1984), with Rutherford's head taking the place of Spock's on the poster. McMahan said this poster was chosen because Rutherford's storyline for the season aligned with The Search for Spock themes of loss and memories. Later that month, the season was discussed by cast and crew during the Star Trek Universe panel at San Diego Comic-Con, where a full trailer was revealed. Gizmodo James Whitbrook called it a "delightful new trailer [that] teases a ton of weird and wonderful adventures", including "Romulans! Glistening abs! Klingons! Adam Bankhurst of IGN highlighted the Deep Space Nine references, as did Ross A. Lincoln at TheWrap who said the trailer "really panders hard to Deep Space Nine fans" by combing the "great tastes" of that series and Lower Decks. Witney Seibold, writing for /Film, noted the Deep Space Nine references and other jokes. She concluded, "We can't wait to spend more time with these goofballs". As they did with the previous seasons, animation studio Titmouse released a shirt with a unique design on it alongside each episode. The designs were available for one week each, and fans who bought all ten received a bonus eleventh shirt.

Release
Streaming and broadcast
The season premiered on Paramount+ in the United States on August 25, 2022, and is running for 10 episodes. Each episode is broadcast in Canada on the same day as the U.S. release by Bell Media on specialty channel CTV Sci-Fi Channel before streaming on Crave. Amazon Prime Video has the streaming rights for several other territories, including Europe, Australia, New Zealand, Japan, and India. In February 2023, Paramount made a new deal with Prime Video for the series' international streaming rights. This allowed the season to be added to Paramount+ in some other countries in addition to remaining on Prime Video.

Home media
The season will be released on DVD and Blu-Ray in the U.S. on April 25, 2023. The release includes bonus features, including a round-up of the references and Easter eggs to other Star Trek series in each episode, a featurette about the visit to Deep Space 9 in "Hear All, Trust Nothing", and audio commentaries with cast and crew for several of the episodes.

Reception
Critical response
Rotten Tomatoes reported 100% approval with an average rating of 8.00/10 based on 5 reviews.

Accolades
Writers for Ars Technica and CNET included Lower Decks'' on their lists of best television series for 2022.

References

External links 
 
 

3
2022 American television seasons